Béla  may refer to:

 Béla (crater), an elongated lunar crater
 Béla (given name), a common Hungarian male given name

See also

 Bela (disambiguation)
 Belá (disambiguation)
 Bělá (disambiguation)

de:Béla
pl:Béla